Dasht-e Dal (also Romanized as Dasht-e Dāl, Dasht Dāl, and Dasht-i-Dal; also known as Dashteh Āl) is a village in Posht Par Rural District, Simakan District, Jahrom County, Fars Province, Iran. At the 2006 census, its population was 181, in 41 families.

References 

Populated places in Jahrom County